Jet Black & Jealous is the second studio album by American country music group Eli Young Band. It was released on September 16, 2008 by Universal South. The album's first single, "When It Rains", peaked at #34 on the Billboard Hot Country Songs chart. A second single, "Always the Love Songs", was released to country radio in September 2008, and debuted at #60 on the Billboard Hot Country Songs chart, ultimately peaking at #11. Originally written by New Orleans-born songwriter Paul Sanchez, the song "Jet Black & Jealous" was re-written for the Eli Young Band by Scooter Carusoe.

Content
"When It Rains" was the album's first single, spending more than thirty weeks on the charts and peaking at #34 on the U.S. Billboard Hot Country Songs chart. After it came "Always the Love Songs," which became the band's first Top 20 hit with a peak of #11. The album's third and fourth singles, "Radio Waves" and "Guinevere," peaked at #35 and #45, respectively.

Critical reception
Andrew Leahey of Allmusic gave the album three-and-a-half stars out of five, saying that the "songs borrow from rock and pop without ever fully entering either camp."

Juli Thanki of Engine 145 gave "Radio Waves" a "thumbs up," describing it as "one of the worst" songs on the album, but saying that it recalled the sound of the Gin Blossoms and was "far from unlistenable."

Track listing

Personnel

Eli Young Band
Mike Eli- acoustic guitar, lead vocals
Jon Jones- bass guitar, background vocals
Chris Thompson- drums
James Young- electric guitar, harmonica, mandolin, background vocals

Additional Musicians
Vince Barnhart- background vocals
Rick Brantley- harmonica
Chris Carmichael- strings
Fred Eltringham- percussion
Erik Herbst- baritone guitar
Russ Pahl- pedal steel guitar
Blu Sanders- acoustic guitar, background vocals
Michael Webb- Hammond organ
Mike Wrucke- banjo, acoustic guitar, electric guitar, pedal steel guitar, background vocals
Tommy Young- Hammond organ

Charts

Weekly charts

Year-end charts

References

2008 albums
Eli Young Band albums
Show Dog-Universal Music albums